Ealdred was styled as Dux (Duke) by Offa (the king of Mercia) of the Anglo-Saxon kingdom of Hwicce but considered himself as King, jointly ruling with his brothers Eanberht and Uhtred in the later half of the 8th century AD.

In 757 Eanberht, Uhtred, and Ealdred, granted land to Bishop Milred, and in 759 to Abbot Headda.

In 778 a charter of King Offa of Mercia Ealdred is styled as Dux of the Hwicce (Duke) in the charter Ealdred received a grant of land from Offa. It seems that soon after Ealdred's death Offa absorbed Hwicce but possibly kept Ealdred's relatives as Ealdorman.

See also
Hwicce

References

External links
 

Hwiccan monarchs
8th-century English monarchs